"Do Wah Diddy Diddy" is a song written by Jeff Barry and Ellie Greenwich and originally recorded in 1963, as "Do-Wah-Diddy", by the American vocal group the Exciters.  Cash Box described the Exciters' version as "a sparkling rocker that bubbles over with coin-catching enthusiasm" and said that the "great lead job is backed by a fabulous instrumental arrangement." It was made internationally famous by the British band Manfred Mann.

Manfred Mann version
It was soon covered by British R&B, beat and pop band Manfred Mann. Manfred Mann's version was released on 10 July 1964. It spent two weeks at No. 1 of the UK Singles Chart in August and two weeks at No. 1 of the U.S. Billboard Hot 100 in October.  Billboard said it "features powerful beat with Mann's solo echoed by male chorus."  Cash Box described it as "a thumpin' novelty rocker that's right up the teeners' alley."

Chart history

Weekly charts

Year-end charts

Fun Factory version

In 1995, Fun Factory released a cover version of the song. Only a few lines of lyrics were retained, and supplemented by rap passages. It reached the top 10 in Germany and Spain and No.11 in Austria.

Track listings 
CD-Maxi
 Doh Wah Diddy (Dee Dee Radio) - 3:31	
 Doh Wah Diddy (Dee Dee Fun-Tastic Extended) - 4:43	
 Doh Wah Diddy (Fly Bass Remix) - 4:31	
 Doh Wah Diddy (Medium Houze) - 4:43	
 Fun Factory's Theme II - 3:24

Charts

Year-end charts

Other cover versions

 The song has been covered many times, notably by DJ Ötzi whose version titled "Do Wah Diddy" peaked at No.9 on the Ö3 Austria Top 40, as well as charting in Germany, Switzerland, the UK and Ireland. 

 A French cover version, "Vous les copains, je ne vous oublierai jamais", by Sheila (singer) became a big hit in France in 1964. 

 Swedish singer Claes Dieden reached number 14 on Tio i Topp with his rendition in 1969.

In popular culture
The song was featured in the 1981 film Stripes, used as a marching cadence by characters played by Bill Murray and Harold Ramis in boot camp. This usage inspired real-life Army units to use it as a marching song.

The novelty item Travis the Singing Trout, a successor to Big Mouth Billy Bass sings a parody version of the song, about how the fish ended up mounted on a plaque. 

The song was featured in the Full House episode "A Fish Called Martin", sung by Michelle.

See also
 List of number-one singles from the 1960s (UK)
 List of Billboard Hot 100 number-one singles of 1964

References

1963 songs
1964 singles
1996 singles
Songs written by Ellie Greenwich
Songs written by Jeff Barry
Manfred Mann songs
Fun Factory (band) songs
DJ Ötzi songs
Billboard Hot 100 number-one singles
Cashbox number-one singles
UK Singles Chart number-one singles
RPM Top Singles number-one singles
His Master's Voice singles
Capitol Records singles
Curb Records singles
Song recordings produced by John Burgess